Events in the year 2010 in Ghana.

Incumbents
 President: John Atta Mills
 Vice President: John Dramani Mahama
 Chief Justice: Georgina Theodora Wood
 Speaker of Parliament: Joyce Bamford-Addo

Events

December
15 December - John Atta Mills, President of Ghana commissions production of the country's oil and gas for export.

National holidays
Holidays in italics are "special days", while those in regular type are "regular holidays".
 January 1: New Year's Day
 March 6: Independence Day
 May 1: Labor Day
 December 25: Christmas
 December 26: Boxing day

In addition, several other places observe local holidays, such as the foundation of their town. These are also "special days."

References

 
2010s in Ghana
Years of the 21st century in Ghana
Ghana
Ghana